Chrysanthemum is a 1991 children's picture book by American writer and illustrator Kevin Henkes.

Chrysanthemum was chosen as an ALA Notable Book and the School Library Journal Best Book of the Year, and it is on the Horn Book Fanfare Honor List. Based on a 2007 online poll, the National Education Association listed the book as one of its "Teachers' Top 100 Books for Children." It was one of the "Top 100 Picture Books" of all time in a 2012 poll by School Library Journal.

Summary
Chrysanthemum is a young mouse who loves her unique name until she is teased about it by her classmates. Her main tormentors are three girls named Jo, Rita, and Victoria, who ridicule her for being named after a flower and point out that her name is so long it barely fits on a name tag. Chrysanthemum expresses her sadness to her parents, who comfort her with her favorite meals and a game of Parcheesi while her father secretly reads a book on child psychology. 

One day, her class gets a new music teacher named Ms. Twinkle to help them with an upcoming musical. Chrysanthemum is assigned to be a daisy, which makes Jo, Rita and Victoria tease her once again. Ms. Twinkle confronts them, and reveals that her first name, Delphinium, is also long and inspired by a flower. The three apologize to her, and Chrysanthemum’s confidence in her name is restored. Later, Ms. Twinkle gives birth to a daughter, whom she names Chrysanthemum.

Adaptions
In 1998 Weston Woods developed an animated story based on the book's illustrations, which was narrated by Meryl Streep. In 2002 it was produced by Newvideo and Scholastic and bundled with 5 other animated stories on a "Scholastic Storybook Treasures" DVD.

In popular culture
The book was featured in an episode of Kino's Storytime and was read by Paula Poundstone.

References

1991 children's books
American children's books
American picture books
Books about mice and rats
Greenwillow Books books